American singer Adam Lambert has released five studio albums, one live album, five compilation albums, five extended plays, twenty-four singles, and thirteen music videos. As of January 2011, he had sold 1.2 million albums and 4.2 million singles worldwide.

After Lambert's coming in second place in American Idol, Rufftown Recordings released a demo album of song recordings made prior to his being on American Idol. The album, Take One, was released on November 17, 2009. It debuted and peaked on the Billboard 200 at number 72, and as of January 2010 had sold over 40,000 copies in the United States. Lambert's mainstream debut album, For Your Entertainment, was released one week after Take One, on November 23, 2009, via RCA Records. It features the lead-song from the 2012 film, and is also available on the film's soundtrack as well. To date, the album has been certified Platinum in Canada and in New Zealand. The album's first single was its title track "For Your Entertainment". The song failed to significantly impact the Billboard Hot 100, only charting to number 61. However, it has become a Top 5 single on the Hot Dance Club Songs chart and has been more successful internationally—being a Top 10 single in both New Zealand and Finland. The song was also certified Platinum in Canada. The next single released, "Whataya Want from Me", has become the highest-charting single from the album and Lambert's most successful single thus far, peaking at number 10 on Billboard Hot 100, and has experienced international success. The third single release was "If I Had You", which became another top 30 single, both in the States and in some international markets.

Lambert's second studio album, Trespassing, was released on May 15, 2012 and topped the Billboard 200 chart. The album has been met with a generally favorable reception from critics and spawned three singles, "Better Than I Know Myself", "Never Close Our Eyes" and "Trespassing". Lambert's former label RCA Records released The Very Best of Adam Lambert on May 27, 2014, featuring hits from his two studio albums as well as performances lifted from his time on both American Idol and Glee.

Albums

Studio albums

Live albums

Compilation albums

Extended plays

Singles

As lead artist

As featured artist

Promotional singles

Other charted songs

Other appearances

Music videos

Guest appearances

Notes

References

External links 

 
 [ Adam Lambert overview] at AllMusic

Discography
American Idol discographies
Discographies of American artists
Pop music discographies